Jennifer Holmes may refer to:

 Jennifer Holmes (actress) (born 1955), American television actress
 Jennifer Holmes (pornographic actress) (born 1956), American bondage model and pornographic actress
 Jennifer C. Holmes, actress who appeared on U.S. TV series This Is Us

See also 
 Jennifer L. Holm (fl. 2000s), American writer